Urmila Srabonti Kar is a Bangladeshi television actress. She has appeared more than a dozen TV dramas.

Early life
Urmila was born on 18 July 1990, to Ananta Kar, a military officer, and Tripty Kar.

Career
In 2009, Urmila participated in Lux Channel I Superstar where she was placed 5th runner-up. This fame brought her chance to several TV dramas. She modeled for many TV commercials.

Her first TV drama was Jatil Prem in 2010. Among the other TV dramas in which she has appeared are Moneybag, Chirkut, Bou Kidnap, Election Caricature, Bhalobashar Etibritto, and Tumi More Bhuliaso.

She played the role of Jui in the 52-episode TV serial Shonar Shekol opposite actor Ziaul Faruq Apurba. They have also acted together in another TV serial called Sunflower, with veteran actress Tarin Jahan. From 2017, she is portraying a role in Bangla TV show Bou-Bibi-Begum.

Personal life
She lost her father in October, 2015.

References

Further reading
 
 
 
 
 
 

Bangladeshi actresses
Bangladeshi television actresses
Bengali female models
Bengali Hindus
Bangladeshi Hindus
1990 births
Living people
Chittagong Cantonment Public College alumni